Harold Isherwood (May 1905 – after 1928) was an English professional footballer who played in the Football League for Birmingham and Bournemouth & Boscombe Athletic.

Isherwood was born in Darwen, Lancashire. He played football for Fleetwood before signing for First Division club Sunderland in 1926. He failed to break through to the first team, and left for fellow First Division side Birmingham in May 1927. He was tried out at left back in the last game of the 1926–27 season, on 7 May 1927 in a 3–2 defeat at home to Sheffield United. After spending the whole of the next season in the reserves, Isherwood moved on to Bournemouth & Boscombe Athletic. He played 18 games in the Third Division South, then dropped into non-league football with Worcester City in 1929.

Notes

References

1905 births
Year of death missing
People from Darwen
English footballers
Association football fullbacks
Fleetwood Town F.C. players
Sunderland A.F.C. players
Birmingham City F.C. players
AFC Bournemouth players
Worcester City F.C. players
English Football League players
Date of birth missing
Place of death missing